This is a list of solar energy topics.

A
 Air mass coefficient
 Artificial photosynthesis

B
 BP Solar
  BrightSource Energy
  Building-integrated photovoltaics

C
 Carbon nanotubes in photovoltaics
 Central solar heating plant
 Community solar farm
 Compact linear Fresnel reflector
 Concentrating photovoltaics
 Concentrating solar power
 Crookes radiometer

D
 Daylighting
 Horace de Saussure
  Desertec
 Drake Landing Solar Community
 Duck curve
  Dye-sensitized solar cell

E
 Effect of sun angle on climate
 Energy tower (downdraft)
 EURO-SOLAR Programme
  European Photovoltaic Industry Association

F
 Feed-in tariff
 First Solar
Flip Flap
 Fresnel reflector
 Charles Fritts
 Calvin Fuller

G
 Geomagnetic storm
  Global dimming
  Greenhouse
  Growth of photovoltaics

H
 Halo (optical phenomenon)
 Helioseismology
 Heliostat
 Home Energy Storage

I
 Indosolar
 Insolation
 Installed solar power capacity
 Abram Ioffe
 ISE (Fraunhofer Institute for Solar Energy Systems)
 Ivanpah Solar Power Facility

J
 Jinko Solar

L
 Light tube
 List of photovoltaic power stations
 List of solar thermal power stations
 Loanpal

M
 Magnetic sail
 Auguste Mouchout
 Moura photovoltaic power station

N
 Nanocrystal solar cell
 Net metering
 Nevada Solar One

P
 Parabolic reflector
 Parabolic trough
 Passive solar
 Passive solar building design
 Photoelectric effect
  Photovoltaic array
 Photovoltaic system
  Photovoltaic thermal hybrid solar collector
 Photovoltaics
 Photovoltaics in transport
 Polymer solar cell
 Polytunnel
 PV financial incentives

R
 Row cover

S
 Salt evaporation pond
 Sandia National Laboratories
 Wolfgang Scheffler
 SEGS
 Seasonal thermal energy storage (STES)
 Soil solarization
  Solar air conditioning
 Solar and Heliospheric Observatory
 Solar azimuth angle
 Solar balloon
 Solar bowl
 Solar box cooker
 Solar car
  Solar car racing
 Solar cell
 Solar cell efficiency
  Solar cell research
 Solar-charged vehicle
 Solar chemical
 Solar chimney
 Solar collector
 Solar combisystem
 Solar constant
 Solar cooker
 Solar cooling
 Solar cycle
 Solar Decathlon
 Solar desalination
 Solar easement
 solar eclipse
 Solar Energy Generating Systems
 Solar flare
 Solar fuel
 Solar furnace
 Solar greenhouse (technical)
 Solar heating
 Solar hot water in Australia
 Solar hydrogen panel
 Solar lamp
Solar map
 Solar maximum
 Solar minimum
 Solar mirror
 Solar nebula
 Solar neon
 Solar Orbiter
 Solar oven
 Solar pond
 Solar power
 Solar power by country
 Solar power in Australia
 Solar power in Canada
 Solar power in China
 Solar power in the European Union
 Solar power in Germany
 Solar power in India
  Solar power in Israel
 Solar power in Japan
 Solar power in Pakistan
 Solar power in Portugal
  Solar power in Romania
  Solar power in Spain
 Solar power in Turkey
 Solar power in the United Kingdom
 Solar power in the United States
 Solar power plants in the Mojave Desert
 Solar power satellite
 Solar power tower
 Solar-powered desalination unit
 Solar-powered pump
  Solar-powered watch
  The Solar Project
 Solar prominence
 Solar proton event
 Solar-pumped laser
 Solar radiation
 Solar radiation pressure
 Solar sail
 Solar savings fraction
 Solar shingles
 Solar still
 Solar thermal collector
 Solar thermal energy
 Solar thermal rocket
 Solar Total Energy Project
 Solar tracker
 Solar updraft tower
 Solar variation
 Solar variation theory
 Solar vehicle
 Solar water disinfection
 Solar water heating
 Solar wind
 Solarium
 SolarPACES
 Sopogy
 Space-based solar power
 Sun
 Sun tanning
 Sunburn
 Sunscreen
 Sunshade

T
Mária Telkes
Thin-film
 Timeline of solar cells
 Topaz Solar Farm
 Total spectrum solar concentrator
 Trombe wall

U
 Ubiquitous Energy

W
 World Solar Challenge

X

Z

See also 
 List of environment topics
 List of photovoltaics companies

Solar energy topics